The following is a list of players of the now-defunct Pittsburgh Ironmen professional basketball team.

John Abramovic
Moe Becker
Mike Bytzura
Joe Fabel
Nat Frankel
Gorham Getchell
Coulby Gunther
Noble Jorgensen
Roger Jorgensen
Tony Kappen
Press Maravich
Ed Melvin
Red Mihalik
Walt Miller
John Mills
Stan Noszka
Harry Zeller

References
Pittsburgh Ironmen all-time roster @ basketball-reference.com

National Basketball Association all-time rosters